Mina Azarian (born 25 September 1959 in Iran) is a Swedish actress. Azarian is best known for her role as Shaisteh in the Swedish TV series Tre kronor.

Filmography
Enkronan (1987)
Beck – Lockpojken (TV series, 1997)
Tre kronor (TV series, 1998–1999)
Före stormen (2000)
Mellan himmel och hästben (2002)
Kissed by Winter (2005)
Labyrint (TV series, 2007)
 Blå ögon (English Blue Eyes, TV series, 2004-2005)
 Eternal Summer (in Swedish: Odödliga) (2015)
 Vårdgården (TV series, 2016)
 Bride Price vs. Democracy (2016)
 Modus (TV Series, 2017)
 Uppsalakidnappningen (2018)
 JerryMaya's Detective Agency: The Secret of the Train Robber (2020)
 Måste gitt - Serien (TV Series, 2020)
 Sjukt (TV Series, 2021)

References

External links

1959 births
Swedish film actresses
Living people
Swedish television actresses